Kudakwashe Musharu (born 8 January 1987) is a Zimbabwean footballer who plays as a forward for Zimbabwe Premier Soccer League side Harare City and the Zimbabwe national team.

Career

Club
Musharu began his senior footballing career with Underhill, before moving to Monomotapa United in 2010. His stay with Monomotapa was a fairly short one as he left a year later to join reigning Zimbabwe Premier Soccer League side Motor Action. He remained with Motor Action between 2011 and 2014, he left in the latter to sign for How Mine. In April 2014, Musharu had a trial with South African club AmaZulu but failed to earn a contract, likewise in January 2015 when he had a trial with Mpumalanga Black Aces. Musharu departed How Mine at the end of 2017 following the club's withdrawal from the Premier Soccer League.

He joined Harare City in March 2018.

International
Musharu has played three times for the Zimbabwe national team. His only goal for his nation came in 2013 in a friendly against Malawi. In 2014, he played in both of Zimbabwe's 2015 Africa Cup of Nations qualifiers against Tanzania.

Career statistics

International
.

International goals
. Scores and results list Zimbabwe's goal tally first.

References

External links
 

1987 births
Living people
Zimbabwean footballers
Zimbabwe international footballers
Association football forwards
Monomotapa United F.C. players
Motor Action F.C. players
How Mine F.C. players
Harare City F.C. players
Sportspeople from Gweru